Moritz Jahn (born Moritz Glaser, 17 April 1995) is a German actor and musician. He is best known to international audiences for his role in the Netflix show Dark.

Career

Acting
Moritz Jahn became known as "Karol" in the children's show Die Pfefferkörner, in which he was the main actor from 2007 to 2009. His first lead role came in 2010 in the two-part ZDF television movie Prinz and Bottel. Jahn played the double role of Calvin and Kevin. In 2011, Jahn starred in Der Himmel hat vier Ecken, in which he played his first theatrical role. He was nominated for the Max-Ophüls Prize for his performance in 2016's . In 2017, he was seen in Bettys Diagnose in a supporting role, playing a 17-year-old with health problems. The same year, he appeared in the mystery series Dark as Magnus Nielsen, the rebellious son of Ulrich Nielsen (played by Oliver Masucci).

In 2019, Jahn sat on the jury of the Bundesfestival Junger Film youth festival in Sankt Ingbert alongside director Andreas Dresen and actress Lucie Hollmann.

Music
Jahn has been performing as a musician since 2018. His band, known as Moritz Jahn & Frische Luft, consists of Moritz on vocals and guitar, Robert Koehler (bass, accordion, and vocals), Sebastian Scheipers (guitar, vocals), Jannis Heron (drums), and Henning von Hertel (guitar, mandolin). They released their debut EP, Love, Hate & the Mistakes of a Lifetime, in 2019. This was followed by another EP, Rascals, in 2020. Their recent singles include "Emerald Beauty", which was released in December 2020. More recent releases include "More Than You Can Chew" (26 November 2021), "Kanoa" (5 December 2021), and "Hamborger Veermaster" (22 December 2021). Moritz Jahn and Frische Luft released their debut album, Soliloquy, on 1 April 2022.

Filmography

Discography
Albums
 Soliloquy (2022)

EPs
 Love, Hate & the Mistakes of a Lifetime (2019)
 Rascals (2020)

Singles
 "Ghost" (2020)
 "Back to the Roots" (2019)
 "Love, Hate & the Mistakes of a Lifetime" (2019)
 "Part of the World" (2019)
 "Time" (2019)
 "Goliath – Live Session" (2019)
 "Emerald Beauty" (2020)

References

External links
 
 Official website

1995 births
Living people
Male actors from Hamburg
German male film actors